Deathcare (also death care, death-care or after-deathcare) is the planning, provision, and improvement of post-death services, products, policy, and governance. Here, deathcare functions to describe the industry of deathcare workers, the policy and politics surrounding deathcare provision, and as an interdisciplinary field of academic study.

Deathcare, from the point of clinical death, has a diverse timeline. The first point of care often involves immediate healthcare professionals and responders closest to the person who has past away, including doctors, nurses, palliative and end-of-life care workers. From here, the care of deceased individuals has a culturally, religious, and personal course. This can involve a range of people from religious figures, morticians, to grave keepers – all of these roles formulating to what can be known as deathcare workers.

Etymology 
The word deathcare is a compound term from the words death and care. It can also take the form of death care, however this is mostly used in the United States and Canada in the Anglosphere, where deathcare is a preferred variation elsewhere in the English speaking world reflecting on the preferred version of healthcare in places like the UK, Australia, India, etc.

History 
The provision of deathcare has historically and often continues to be a highly decentralized and diverse practice combining multiple actors and stages. Nonetheless, trends in providers and purveyors of deathcare do exist throughout different eras: in the time prior to the American Civil War, for instance, the majority of care for the deceased was performed by one's own family members. Specifically, women in the family were expected, as a part of their domestic duties, to oversee and execute the sanitization, dressing, and ultimately burial of their families' corpses. However, following the number of deaths during the Civil War, the practice of embalming became commonplace, as fallen soldiers had to be preserved before their bodies could be transported vast distances from the battlefield back to their hometowns. Following the war, it became the norm to have loved-ones bodies prepared and cared for by morticians, and spaces for services to be provided by funeral home directors. Coinciding with the professionalization of the funeral industry, the advances of the medical field changed expectations around an infectious disease course. That is, rather than comfort care, medical providers began to offer life-saving, and thus life-changing measures, e.g. antibiotics. This resulted in a change in the concentration of the placement of ill-people: rather than remaining at home, people began to rely increasingly on hospitals as a place of healing, especially in urban areas where hospitals were more accessible. In areas that allowed for access to hospital systems, this inevitably resulted in a greater proportion of deaths occurring in hospitals rather than at home, thus bolstering the change from home-based care to professional, funeral home-based care of the deceased in the urban West.

In other countries, the social practices around deathcare vary compared to the U.S. For instance, in Hindu culture, women have been barred from attending cremation rituals, and even from touching the deceased. Before World War Two in Britain, women were "commonly responsible for laying-out the body", but following the war were barred from such a role given the expedient professionalization of the deathcare industry.

20th century 
Particularly with social phenomena like the growth of the welfare state and urbanisation of population centres, central government involvement with the deathcare process has risen as societal challenges present themselves to deathcare.

21st century 
Examples of government policy involvement include the impact of new burial methods like human composting to pressures like COVID-19 placing on those involved with deathcare as well as their families. In addition to government policy, the effects of COVID-19 have directly impacted those involved in deathcare: funeral directors were shown to have increased rates of burnout following the first wave of the pandemic.

Delivery

Government 
National and regional governments are often responsible for providing the legal framework for deathcare to operate within, including laws and guidance on what deathcare techniques, practices, and what individuals/ organisations are involved. However, this has a varying level of non-government organisations, third-sector, religious, and private organisations (such as funeral homes) take part in both providing and shaping deathcare policy and practice. However, most research on state interactions within deathcare is limited to the US, with further research needed elsewhere.

Governments can also become a major focal point for deathcare services in specific situations, such as with deaths in the military, prisons, or in extraordinary events. COVID-19 is an example of global governmental intervention to provide mass fatality management to cope with high human fatality around the world. This also brought up issues of inequality and inequity within deathcare as some deaths throughout the pandemic were treated as "more tragic" compared to others, highlighted as a public values failure as economic productivity and social worth overruled public health and humanity.

Industry 
Analysts have stated that the deathcare industry can be divided into three portions: the ceremony and tribute (funeral or memorial service); the disposition of remains through cremation or burial (interment); and memorialization in the form of monuments, marker inscriptions or memorial art.

Deathcare industry is a multifactorial sector including, but not limited to: companies and organizations that provide services related to death memorials, funerals, and burials. Theses types of ceremonies includes service use of coffins, headstones, crematoriums, and funeral homes. Most of the death service industry has consisted of small businesses that have been consolidated as time has gone on.

There is a global marketplace for deathcare in the produces, services, and insurance that surrounds someone's death. This is a market that has shown expanding fiscal growth in years 2020 to 2021 supported by a compound annual growth rate of 5.6%. The market is expected to continue to grow to a compound annual growth rate of 8% by year 2025 expecting to reach a value of 147.38 billion dollars up from 103.93 billion dollars in 2020.

The deathcare process comes with multiple costs to allow for certain rituals to take place. Including to removal/transfer of remains to funeral homes (est $340), embalming (est $740), Hearse use ($340), metal burial casket (est $2500). The estimated median cost of funeral with burial and funeral was estimated by an NFDA news release to be $7640.

Deathcare industrial complex (DIC) has been outlined as a concept, mirroring the military-industrial complex concept, in at least the US and potentially Western countries as an industry: "profit-driven, medicalised, de-ritualized and patriarchal [in] form, modern death care fundamentally distorts humans' relationship to mortality, and through it, nature". The death care industry in the United States is deemed controversial due to high costs and negative environmental impacts.

Localized efforts to reform and offer innovative deathcare practices can be seen in the natural deathcare movements such as human composting to natural burials.

Environmental impact 
Common funeral practices in Western society are associated with notable environmental impacts. Metal caskets can deteriorate and release harmful toxins when buried, leading to contamination of land and water. Cremation also uses a significant amount of fuel consumption, releasing chemicals and carbon emissions.

With the threat of climate change, conversations about green death practices are becoming more prevalent. Natural burial methods are being developed to promote eco-sustainability in deathcare.

References

External links 
 OMEGA – Journal of Death and Dying

Death
Health policy
Medical humanities
Public health
Public services
Sanitation
Funeral-related industry